is an original Japanese anime television series produced by A-1 Pictures. The series aired from October to December 2021.

Premise
In the story, vampires masquerade as visual kei musicians. Once a year, they gather together in Harajuku at an event known as "Visual Prison". When Ange Yuki travels to Harajuku to see his favorite act, he witnesses a musical battle between the bands Eclipse and Lost Eden.

Characters

Oz

Lost Eden

Eclipse

Mascot

Despite his color and name, Panya is in fact, a cat. He lives around Harajuku.

Production and release

The anime project was announced during Aniplex's panel at AnimeJapan 2021. The series is created by Noriyasu Agematsu and animated by A-1 Pictures. Elements Garden composes the series' music, while Ikumi Katagiri takes charge of the original character designs.  Tomoya Tanaka is directing the series, with Jouji Furuta serving as chief director, Yukie Sugawara penning the series' scripts, and Minako Shiba designing the characters. It aired from October 9 to December 25, 2021 on Tokyo MX and other channels. The band Oz performed the series' opening theme song "Zankoku Shangri-la", while the band Lost Eden performed the series' ending theme song "Bloody Kiss". Funimation licensed the series outside of Asia.

Episode list

References

External links
 

A-1 Pictures
Anime with original screenplays
Funimation
Music in anime and manga
Tokyo MX original programming
Vampires in anime and manga
Visual kei